Flickering Flame: The Solo Years Volume 1 is a compilation album of former Pink Floyd member Roger Waters' solo material, released in Europe and Australia in 2002 (see 2002 in music). It was not released in the US and UK until 30 May 2011, when this album along with the rest of the Waters' solo material was released as part of "The Roger Waters Collection" Boxset. The album will be sold separately from the compilation, for a 12-month term.

The original versions of this album were released on CD with a note on the cover saying "will not play on a PC/Mac", due to a form of copy protection. Users of Apple computers reported they were unable to eject CDs with this kind of copy protection.

Track listing
All tracks composed by Roger Waters, except where noted.

Personnel
01 Knockin' On Heaven's Door
Roger Waters – vocals, bass
Simon Chamberlain – keyboards
Clem Clempson – electric/acoustic guitar
Katie Kissoon – backing vocals
Nick Griffiths – produced

02 Too Much Rope & 05 Three Wishes
Roger Waters – words & music, vocals
Patrick Leonard – keyboards
Andy Fairweather Low – Rickenbacker 12 string played with a feather
Geoff Whitehorn – guitars
Steve Lukather – additional guitars
James Johnson – bass
Graham Broad – drums
Luis Conte – percussion
Katie Kissoon – background vocals
Doreen Chanter – background vocals
Jessica & Jordan Leonard – screaming kids at the end
National Philharmonic Orchestra
Patrick Leonard & Roger Waters – produced
Nick Griffiths – co-produced & recorded
James Guthrie – mixed

03 The Tide Is Turning, 07 Who Needs Information & 11 Radio Waves
Roger Waters – words & music, vocals, bass
Andy Fairweather Low & Jay Stapely – electric guitar
Mel Collins – saxophones
Ian Ritchie – fairlight programming, drum programming, piano, keyboards
Graham Broad – drums and percussion
Suzanne Rhatigan – main backing vocals
Ian Ritchie, John Phirkell, Peter Thomas – horn section
Ian Ritchie – arranged
Roger Waters & Ian Ritchie – produced

04 Perfect Sense, Part I & II & 08 Each Small Candle
Roger Waters – words & music, vocals, bass & guitar
Doyle Bramhall II – guitar
Snowy White – guitar
Andy Fairweather – guitar, bass & vocal
Graham Broad – drums
Jon Carin – keyboards
Andy Wallace – hammond/keyboards
Katie Kissoon, Susannah Melvion, P P Arnold – low vocals
P P Arnold - solo vocals on Perfect Sense 
James Guthrie – produced & mixed

06 5.06am (Every Stranger's Eyes)
Roger Waters – words & music, vocals, bass, guitar
Andy Bown – hammond organ & 12 string guitar
Ray Cooper – percussion
Eric Clapton – lead guitar
Michael Kamen – piano, National Philharmoninc Orchestra conducted & arranged
Andy Newmark – drums
David Sanborn – saxophone
Madeline Bell, Katie Kissoon, Doreen Chanter – backing vocals
Raphael Ravenscroft, Kevin Flanagan, Vic Sullivan – horns
Roger Waters & Michael Kamen – produced

09 Flickering Flame
Roger Waters – words & music, vocals, acoustic guitar, bass
Jon Carin – keyboards
Doyle Bramhall II – guitar, bass
Roger Waters & Nick Griffiths – produced

10 Towers of Faith
Roger Waters – words & music, vocals
Matt Irving – keyboards
Jay Stapely – electric guitar
John Lingwood – linn programming
Freddie KRC – drums
Mel Collins – saxophone
John Gordon – bass
Clare Torry – vocals
Roger Waters – produced
Nick Griffiths – co-producer & engineer
Colin Lyon – assistant engineer

12 Lost Boys Calling (original demo)
Ennio Morricone – music
Roger Waters – words, vocals
Rick Wentworth – orchestration
Nick Griffiths – mixed

References

External links
Pink Floyd Hyperbase, "Flickering Flame" entry

Roger Waters albums
Albums produced by Roger Waters
Albums produced by James Guthrie (record producer)
Albums produced by Patrick Leonard
2002 compilation albums
Albums produced by Nick Griffiths
Albums produced by Ian Ritchie